The 2021 IBSF Junior World Championships in bobsleigh and skeleton took place in St. Moritz, Switzerland, from 22 to 24 January 2021.

Schedule

Ten events took place.

All times are local (UTC+1).

Bobsleigh

Skeleton

Medal summary

Medal table

Bobsleigh

Junior

Under-23

Skeleton

Junior

Under-20

See also

IBSF World Championships 2021
IBSF European Championships 2021

References

Junior World Championships
Junior World Championships
2021 in Swiss sport
2021 in youth sport
2021 IBSF Junior World Championships
Sport in St. Moritz
January 2021 sports events in Europe